Christopher Allen Hawkey (born December 25, 1970) is a country music artist who is a member of the Minneapolis band Rocket Club and is the vocalist of the Chris Hawkey Band. He lives in the Twin Cities and also produces and co-hosts a sports radio morning show, Power Trip Morning Show.

Personal life and radio
Chris Hawkey was born a twin whose brother didn't survive their birth and raised in Union City, Indiana, where he graduated from Mississinawa Valley High School. Starting in 1989 he attended a broadcasting school in Dayton, Ohio, pursuing careers in both radio and music. He got a job running a control board for the syndicated Howard Stern Show before getting hired in 2001 to co-host and produce the Power Trip Morning Show on KFAN Radio, a sports radio network. Hawkey produces the radio broadcast of the Minnesota Vikings and is a play-by-play announcer for AMSOIL Championship Snocross on CBS Sports Network.

Musical career
In 2001 Hawkey recorded his first solo project, "Minutes to Memories", which showcased his songwriting. He had a second solo project, "The Pursuit", which was a benefit partnership that raised money from record sales.

RYZ
Ryz was a rock band that performed mostly in the Los Angeles area in the late 1980s and early 1990s. Chris Hawkey was the lead singer of the band. They recorded such songs as "The Distance", "Wicked Ways", "Waiting and Watching", and "Wild Ones" 
Ryz ultimately broke up when offered the opportunity to go on tour opening for Gorky Park. Hawkey thought it was a great opportunity but other members did not want to leave their day jobs, so they went their separate directions.

Rocket Club
In 2008, Hawkey became the lead vocalist of Rocket Club, a Minneapolis band, and stayed with the group for six years. As a part of Rocket Club, he has shared the stage with such artists as Luke Bryan, Jason Aldean, Sugarland, Dierks Bentley, Miranda Lambert, and Eric Church. In 2022, the band reunited and has started recording new music.

Chris Hawkey Band
In 2014, Hawkey released his first solo country record. The 8-song collection included the hit single "My Kinda Crazy." In 2016 he released another album, Smile, which included the song "Good Liar" by Brett James. The Chris Hawkey Band includes Ryan Liestman (keyboard) and Michael Bland (drummer).

Twin Cities Music Festival
In 2019, Hawkey helped organize and performed at the Twin Cities Summer Jam.

Discography

Albums

Singles

References

External links

People from Union City, Indiana
1970 births
American country singer-songwriters
Country musicians from Indiana
Country musicians from Minnesota
Living people
21st-century American singers
Singer-songwriters from Indiana
Singer-songwriters from Minnesota